The Twentymile River is a river near the Kenai Peninsula in Alaska. It rises in a remote valley from meltwater of several small glaciers in the Chugach Mountains and flows out into a large, wide valley where it receives the water of the Moraine and Glacier rivers. Eventually, the river empties into Turnagain Arm after flowing   to a broad marshy delta alongside the deltas of Portage Creek and the Placer River. Contrary to popular belief, the source of the river is not Twentymile Glacier.

References

Rivers of Alaska